Clères is a commune in the Seine-Maritime department in the Normandy region in north-western France.

Geography
SNCF has a TER railway station in the town.

Heraldry

Population

Places of interest
 The church of Sts. Waast-&-Nicolas, dating from the sixteenth century.
 The church of St. Sauveur at Cordelleville, dating from the twelfth century.
 The church of Notre-Dame at Le Tôt, dating from the twelfth century.
 A château and its park, home of the zoo.
 A seventeenth century sandstone cross.
 Ruins of a medieval castle.
 Several ancient wood-framed houses.
 The eighteenth century market hall ‘Les Halles’.

People with links to the commune
 Jean Delacour, ornithologist, lived here.

Twin towns
  Goldenstedt, Germany, since 1989
  Leverkusen, Germany, since 2000

See also
Communes of the Seine-Maritime department

References

Bibliography
 Hippolyte Lemarchand, Histoire du canton de Clères, 1891 ; Le Pucheux, Fontaine-le-Bourg, 2002

External links

Clare, Clere, and Clères A paper on the origin of the town's name.
Tourist Office website 
Site perso sur CLERES 

Communes of Seine-Maritime